St. Francis County is a county in the U.S. state of Arkansas. As of the 2020 census, the population was 23,090. The county seat is Forrest City.

St. Francis County comprises the Forrest City, Arkansas Micropolitan Statistical Area, which is also included in the Memphis-Forrest City, TN-MS-AR Combined Statistical Area.

History
The county was formed on October 13, 1827, and named for the St. Francis River. It is on the eastern border of the state in the Arkansas Delta, formed by the lowlands of the Mississippi River. It was an area of large cotton plantations in the antebellum era, when the workers were enslaved African Americans. It continued as an agricultural area into the late 19th century, when many freedmen became sharecroppers.

Geography

Major highways
 Interstate 40
 U.S. Highway 70
 Highway 1
 Highway 38
 Highway 50
 Highway 75

Adjacent counties
Cross County (north)
Crittenden County (east)
Lee County (south)
Monroe County (southwest)
Woodruff County (northwest)

Demographics

2020 census

As of the 2020 United States Census, there were 23,090 people, 9,388 households, and 5,867 families residing in the county.

2010 census
As of the 2010 census, there were 28,258 people living in the county. 51.9% were Black or African American, 44.2% White, 0.5% Native American, 0.5% Asian, 1.4% of some other race and 1.5% of two or more races. 4.1% were Hispanic or Latino (of any race).

2000 census

As of the 2000 census, there were 29,329 people, 10,043 households, and 7,230 families living in the county. The population density was 18/km2 (46/mi2). There were 11,242 housing units at an average density of 7/km2 (18/mi2). The racial makeup of the county was 48.36% White, 49.01% Black or African American, 0.25% Native American, 0.56% Asian, 0.02% Pacific Islander, 0.40% from other races, and 1.40% from two or more races. 4.88% of the population were Hispanic or Latino of any race.

There were 10,043 households, out of which 35.30% had children under the age of 18 living with them, 46.90% were married couples living together, 20.80% had a female householder with no husband present, and 28.00% were non-families. 25.10% of all households were made up of individuals, and 10.80% had someone living alone who was 65 years of age or older. The average household size was 2.65 and the average family size was 3.17.

In the county, the population was spread out, with 27.90% under the age of 18, 9.90% from 18 to 24, 29.10% from 25 to 44, 21.20% from 45 to 64, and 11.90% who were 65 years of age or older. The median age was 34 years. For every 100 females there were 105.60 males. For every 100 females age 18 and over, there were 105.40 males.

The median income for a household in the county was $26,146, and the median income for a family was $30,324. Males had a median income of $28,389 versus $20,578 for females. The per capita income for the county was $12,483. About 23.10% of families and 27.50% of the population were below the poverty line, including 38.70% of those under age 18 and 23.10% of those age 65 or over.

Government and politics
The Federal Bureau of Prisons Federal Correctional Complex, Forrest City is in Forrest City.

A portion of St. Francis County is represented in the Arkansas State Senate by Republican Ronald R. Caldwell.

In presidential elections, St. Francis County generally votes Democratic. Following Reconstruction and disenfranchisement of black voters at the turn of the century, the county voted Democratic in every election since 1896, other than 1900 (William McKinley), 1908 (William Howard Taft), and 1968 (George Wallace). 

By the late 1960s, white conservatives began to shift into the Republican Party, as was shown by their vote in 1972 for the Richard Nixon landslide. In 1984, Ronald Reagan, who was widely popular, won a landslide in his second term. But after that the county mostly voted for Democratic presidential candidates.

Communities

Cities
Forrest City (county seat)
Madison
Hughes

Towns
Caldwell
Colt
Hughes
Palestine
Wheatley
Widener

Townships

 Black Fish
 Franks (small part of Forrest City)
 Garland (Hughes)
 Goodwin
 Griggs (Widener)
 Heth
 Johnson
 L'Anguille
 Madison (most of Forrest City, Madison
 Prairie (Palestine)
 Telico (Caldwell, Colt, small part of Forrest City)
 Wheatley (most of Wheatley)

Notable people
 Al Green, soul singer
 Charlie Rich, country singer
 Sonny Liston, world heavyweight boxing champion
 Mark R. Martin, Secretary of State of Arkansas

See also

 List of lakes in St. Francis County, Arkansas
 National Register of Historic Places listings in St. Francis County, Arkansas

References

External links
 St. Francis county official website 
 St. Francis, Arkansas entry on the Encyclopedia of Arkansas History & Culture

 
1827 establishments in Arkansas Territory
Populated places established in 1827
Black Belt (U.S. region)
Majority-minority counties in Arkansas